Aureobasidium is a genus of fungi belonging to the family Dothioraceae.

The genus was first described by Pierre Viala and Gaston Boyer in 1891.

Species

The genus contains 26 species:

Aureobasidium aleuritis 
Aureobasidium apocryptum 
Aureobasidium dalgeri 
Aureobasidium harposporum 
Aureobasidium indicum 
Aureobasidium iranianum 
Aureobasidium khasianum 
Aureobasidium leucospermi 
Aureobasidium lilii 
Aureobasidium mangrovei 
Aureobasidium melanogenum 
Aureobasidium microstictum 
Aureobasidium namibiae 
Aureobasidium nigrum 
Aureobasidium pini 
Aureobasidium proteae 
Aureobasidium prunicola 
Aureobasidium pullulans 
Aureobasidium ribis 
Aureobasidium sanguinariae 
Aureobasidium subglaciale 
Aureobasidium thailandense 
Aureobasidium thujae-plicatae 
Aureobasidium tremulum 
Aureobasidium umbellulariae 
Aureobasidium vaccinii

References

Dothideales
Dothideomycetes genera